The Ocean is a 2006 poetry collection by Swedish poet Göran Sonnevi. It won the Nordic Council's Literature Prize in 2006.

References

2006 poetry books
Swedish poetry collections
Nordic Council's Literature Prize-winning works